Love Me If You Dare is a 2003 romantic comedy-drama film directed by Yann Samuell. It stars Guillaume Canet and  Marion Cotillard as best friends Julien Janvier and Sophie Kowalsky who begin playing a game of dares as children and find themselves unable to stop as they grow older, even when the game threatens to destroy their lives.

Plot
The film begins where a little girl, Sophie, is being bullied by other children. Only a bus driver and a boy, Julien, help her collect her books that the others have thrown into a puddle.

To cheer Sophie up, Julien gives her a small tin box, a gift from his fatally ill mother. Because it is important to him, he asks her to lend it back to him from time to time. As Julien wants the box back at the moment he gave it to her, Sophie demands proof of how important it is to him. Julien disengages the handbrake of the bus without hesitation, and the bus full of children rolls down a hill. Their game has begun: the box changes its owner after each completed dare.

Between the son of wealthy Belgian parents and the daughter of poor Polish immigrants a lasting friendship develops. As children, they misbehave in school, wreak havoc on a wedding, and request silly tasks of each other.  As teenagers, their romantic relationships with others suffer as a result of their dares. Meanwhile, the two friends ignore any consequences or punishment during their game.

While they are always looking for the next kick, a love is slowly evolving between the protagonists. Not wanting to admit it, they divert their attention from it by even more extreme dares.

As young adults, Julien tells Sophie that he wants to get married, only later revealing that he means to someone else.  The climax is reached when Sophie interrupts Julien's wedding, after which he is cast out by his father and Sophie is nearly killed during another game. Julien returns to marry his wife, and Sophie declares that they will not see each other for ten years.

Ten years pass, and Julien is married with two children.  Sophie has also married her husband, a famous soccer star. A successful Julien admits that he has not forgotten Sophie, though he assumes that she has forgotten him.  On the night of Julien's tenth wedding anniversary, Sophie sends a message to him, indicating that the game is back on.  Julien and Sophie meet for a brief moment in the midst of another dare, yet it is enough to remind Julien that their game is "better than life itself."  After a dramatic accident, Julien and Sophie finally reunite, despite the protestations of their spouses.

The film has two alternate endings, which are shown consecutively. In the first, Julien and Sophie decide as an ultimate dare to finally share their dream together, their "dream of an eternal love" – the pair embrace while they stand in a construction pit that is about to be filled with concrete. The couple kiss as they are pulled beneath the cement, and both drown in the sludge. The other ending has the now aged Julien and Sophie spending time together in a garden and carrying on playing their game with milder dares. However, the opening scene of the film (an overhead view of a building site and a pit filled with concrete in which the upper side Julien's tin box rests partially sunk) replays, suggesting that the two friends actually did bury themselves and drown beneath the concrete.

Cast
Guillaume Canet – Julien Janvier
Thibault Verhaeghe – 8 year old Julien
Robert Willar – 80-year-old Julien
Marion Cotillard – Sophie Kowalsky
Joséphine Lebas-Joly – 8 year old Sophie
Nathalie Nattier – 80-year-old Sophie
Gérard Watkins – Julien's father
Gilles Lellouche – Sergei Nimov Nimovitch
Emmanuelle Grönvold – Julien's mother
Julia Faure – Sophie's sister
Laetizia Venezia – Christelle Louise Bouchard
Élodie Navarre – Aurélie Miller
Frédéric Geerts – Igor
Manuela Sanchez – Teacher
Philippe Drecq – School headmaster

Soundtrack

The song "La Vie en Rose" permeates the film and dominates much of the soundtrack. Several distinct versions are used, including the Édith Piaf original, covers by Donna Summer, Louis Armstrong, the Brazilian A cappella group Trio Esperança, and French pop artist Zazie, as well as a handful of instrumental cuts. Coincidentally, Marion Cotillard went on to win an Oscar for her portrayal of Piaf in the film La Vie en Rose, also called La Môme. Additionally, Cotillard was subsequently cast in Inception, a science-fiction thriller where Piaf's song, "Non, je ne regrette rien" plays a key role.

A piano arrangement, Ouverture by Philippe Rombi, can also be heard throughout the film.

Track listing
Ouverture – 5:05
Love Theme – 2:29
Solitude / L'Escalier du Temps – 2:22
Beethov' Fantaisie / Cap Ou Pas Cap? – 1:22
Jeux d'enfants – 2:12
Les Lunettes Magiques – 1:51
Derniers Instants – 2:41
Premier Baiser – 2:20
Declaration / Separation – 2:30
Invitation – 5:15
La Vie en Rose (Trio Esperança) – 2:33
10 Ans Plus Tard – 2:23
Mieux Que La Vie (Poursuite) – 2:23
La Vie en Rose (Donna Summer) – 4:56
Le Meilleur et le Pire – 1:49
Sous la Pluie – 3:30
Pour Toujours (Love Theme) – 1:49
La Vie en Rose (Louis Armstrong)-3:24
La Vie en Rose (Zazie) – 3:54

Reception
The film received mixed reviews from North American critics. It holds a 44% "Rotten" rating and a 5.3/10 average rating on review aggregation website Rotten Tomatoes based on 79 reviews. The critical consensus states that "The romantic leads are too obnoxious and self-centered to generate interest or sympathy." On Metacritic, the film has a score of 45 out of 100, based on 30 critics, indicating "mixed or average reviews".

Roger Ebert of the Chicago Sun-Times gave the film two out of four stars and called the film "strangely frustrating, because Julien and Sophie choose misery and obsession as a lifestyle, and push far beyond reason." Conversely, James Berardinelli of Reelviews.net awarded the film three out of four stars and praised Canet and Cotillard's performances, opining that they "make one of the most delightful screen couples in recent years."

References

External links

 

2003 films
2003 romantic comedy-drama films
Belgian romantic comedy-drama films
Films directed by Yann Samuell
Films shot in Brussels
French romantic comedy-drama films
2000s French-language films
StudioCanal films
2003 directorial debut films
2003 comedy films
2003 drama films
French-language Belgian films
2000s French films